Su Chi (born 1 October 1949) is a Taiwanese politician. Su served as Secretary-General of the National Security Council from 2008 to 2010. Previously, he was the Minister of the Mainland Affairs Council of the Executive Yuan from 1 February 1999 to 19 May 2000.

Mainland China visit

2005
In 2005, Su accompanied Kuomintang Chairperson Lien Chan to visit Nanjing in Jiangsu to meet with the high officials of Communist Party of China.

2013
In June 2013, Su and delegates led by Kuomintang (KMT) Honorary Chairman Wu Po-hsiung visited China and met with Chinese Communist Party general secretary Xi Jinping. The delegation included KMT Vice Chairpersons Hung Hsiu-chu and Huang Min-hui. This was his first visit to China after he left the National Security Council (NSC), citing that the ROC law prohibits him to visit China at least three years after he had left his NSC post.

Education
MA and Ph.D. in political science from Columbia University
MA in international studies from the SAIS, the Johns Hopkins University
BA from National Chengchi University (Taiwan)

References

Members of the 6th Legislative Yuan
Living people
1949 births
Harvard University alumni
National Chengchi University alumni
Paul H. Nitze School of Advanced International Studies alumni
Columbia Graduate School of Architecture, Planning and Preservation alumni
Kuomintang Members of the Legislative Yuan in Taiwan
Party List Members of the Legislative Yuan